Mackay Building, also known as Mackay Hall, is a historic building located on the campus of Park University at Parkville, Platte County, Missouri.  It was built in 1886, and is a three-story, rock-faced limestone structure with Richardsonian Romanesque, High Victorian Gothic, and Chateauesque style design elements.  It measures approximately 137 feet by 84 feet.  It features a clock tower with tall spire rising in stages from a semi-detached central block, textured wall surfaces, complex roofs and towers, wall dormers, asymmetrical bays, and polychromatic color scheme.

It was listed on the National Register of Historic Places in 1979.

References

Clock towers in Missouri
University and college buildings on the National Register of Historic Places in Missouri
School buildings completed in 1886
Buildings and structures in Platte County, Missouri
National Register of Historic Places in Platte County, Missouri